The monastery of Mohill-Manchan was anciently located at Mohill, in county Leitrim. The earliest church was founded by Manchán of Mohill in the 6th century. Little is known about the former monastic community here. About the year 1216, the monastery became a religious house of the Canons Regular of Saint Augustine dedicated to the Saint Mary until suppression . The Priory of Mohill was briefly revived during Confederate Ireland rule but suppressed again by Cromwellian forces . From the ruins St. Mary's Church, Mohill, of Protestant denomination, was established in the 18th century.

Monastery
The former monastic settlement of Mohill was one of a multitude of monasteries that sprang up during 6th century Ireland. A Christian missionary named Manchan founded a church here between AD. Whether or not Manchan died at Mohill is unknown, though his remains may have been preserved and enshrined here.

Nothing is known of the monastic community at Mohill, but it surely consisted of a church, school, mill, house of hospitality, Christian burial ground, monastic cells, "house of tears", and a round tower. The monastery was governed by the bishop, abbot, and a uniquely Irish "erenagh", power being exercised by one person, or perhaps combined in practical permutations. It was strongly bound to the túath of Muintir Eolais, allowing the Bishop little influence; the lifestyle followed asceticism.

A daughter church at Cloonmorris was founded AD.

Priory

From the 13th century following a reform movement of the Irish church, the monastery became the Priory of Saint Mary's of Mohill-Manchan. The priory belonged in the diocese of Ardagh, with Canons regular adhering to the Rule of St. Augustine.

Personalities
It is impossible to fully catalogue the succession of holders of Abbots, Priors, and Canons at this ancient monastery. The information below is preserved.

* aft. = after
* bef. = before
* d. = died in office, or in-commendam

Annals

The Irish Annals refer to the priory of Mohill many times. For 1430AD the Annals of the Four Masters highlights an interesting privilege was the right of Mohill Priory to offer sanctuary to a fugitive fleeing from enemies. The Annals also records a military invasion of Muintir Eolais in March 1590, when the local Túaths were defeated and Mohill Priory was forfeited to the English crown.

 "".
 "".
 "".
 "".
 "",
 "".
 "".
 "".
 ""

First suppression, 1560-90

From 1540 the English were forcefully suppressing Monasteries throughout Ireland, and "".

Barret's parcel subsequently passing to an englishman named John Crofton , who bequeathed same to his son Henry by a deed dated .

Revival
Confederate Ireland rule was established , and during the Eleven Years' War the "" was re-established in some manner. Ecclesiastical documents record Canon , otherwise Reynolds, being appointed Prior of Maothail-Manchain on 21 August 1648.

Final suppression, 1649–1653
The Priory was suppressed again during devastating Cromwellian conquest of Ireland .

Heritage
Priory clergy were expelled and risked execution under the Penal Laws. In 1666 four Reynolds priests (James, Loghlin, Richard, Walter) are among "forty nine Catholics from hiding places in the woods" in county Roscommon, who signed a letter in support of the Pope and protesting the loss of their 'due liberties'. And in 1713 an elderly Father Connor Reynolds "of Jamestown in the county of Leitrim" who had been exiled in Spain since 1681, was captured hiding in a trunk on a fishing boat arriving at Dungarvan port and imprisoned at Waterford gaol.

Today nothing survives of the early ecclesiastical site here, except for an inaccessible old school-house, and the base of a round tower located near the old persons home in the town. The remains of the abbey or sanctuary forms the south, and east, walls of the Hyde family vault in the graveyard of 'Saint Mary's church' later built on the Priory ruins. The Croftons also built an old Castle at Rinn Lough from the ruins of Mohill Priory, as small free stones of the same class were evidenced in each. There may be other undocumented ruins on the wider monastic site, though it's not classed as a national monument or heritage site.

See also

Charles Reynolds
Muintir Eolais 
Conmhaícne
Mohill (barony)

Notes and references

Notes

Citations

Primary sources

Secondary sources

Annals

Ecclesiastical sources

Miscellaneous sources

Further reading

Christian monasteries in the Republic of Ireland
Religion in County Leitrim
Archaeological sites in County Leitrim
Augustinian monasteries in the Republic of Ireland
Ruins in the Republic of Ireland
Medieval Ireland
History of County Leitrim
Monasteries dissolved under the Irish Reformation
Places of Conmaicne Maigh Rein
Mohill